Guthrie Michael Scott  (30 July 1907 – 14 September 1983) was an Anglican priest and anti-apartheid activist, who joined in the defiance of the apartheid system in South Africa in the 1940s – a long struggle for social justice in that country. He was also an early advocate of nuclear disarmament.

Life
Scott was born in Sussex on 30 July 1907 and educated at King's College, Taunton, Chichester Theological College and St Paul's College, Grahamstown. He was ordained by George Bell in 1932 and began his career with curacies in Slaugham and Kensington. He was Domestic Chaplain to the Bishop of Bombay from 1935 to 1937; and then served at St Paul's Cathedral, Calcutta. In 1943 he moved to Johannesburg where he was Chaplain to the St Alban's Mission. While there he became the first white man to be jailed for resisting that country's racial laws. In 1952, he co-founded the Africa Bureau, "an organisation to advise and support Africans who wished to oppose by constitutional means political decisions affecting their lives and futures imposed by alien governments." He was a leading international promoter of Namibian independence along with Chief Hosea Kutako and Captain Hendrik Samuel Witbooi. For his efforts in the Namibian War of Independence, he has a prominent street named after him in Windhoek.

With Bertrand Russell, he was co-founder of the Committee of 100 in 1960. He met Martin Luther King Jr. during Ghana's celebration of independence.

In later life, Scott was a friend of the philosopher Bertrand Russell. He died on 14 September 1983. There is a memorial window to him at St Pancras Church, Kingston near Lewes.

Works
Scott wrote an autobiography A Time to Speak, published by Faber and Faber in 1958.

Notes

References

1907 births
1983 deaths
20th-century English Anglican priests
Alumni of Chichester Theological College
British anti-war activists
British expatriates in South Africa
English anti–nuclear weapons activists
English religious writers
History of Namibia
Anglican anti-apartheid activists
People educated at King's College, Taunton
People from Crawley
South West African anti-apartheid activists
St Paul's College, Grahamstown alumni